Hesamabad (also Romanized as Ḩesāmābād; also known as Asmawa and Hīssamābād) is a village in Zarrineh Rud Rural District of Bizineh Rud District of Khodabandeh County, Zanjan province, Iran. At the 2006 National Census, its population was 1,817 in 350 households. The following census in 2011 counted 1,723 people in 397 households. The latest census in 2016 showed a population of 1,580 people in 491 households; it was the largest village in its rural district.

References 

Khodabandeh County

Populated places in Zanjan Province

Populated places in Khodabandeh County